Telphusa iriditis is a moth of the family Gelechiidae. It is found in Namibia.

The wingspan is about 12 mm. The forewings are purplish-grey speckled with black, with iridescent green reflections and with three small spots of black irroration on the costa at one-sixth, one-third, and the middle, each with a small brownish-ochreous spot adjacent beneath, some whitish irroration between these extending obliquely towards the disc. There is a black oblique mark in the disc beneath the first of these, and a black longitudinal spot beneath the second. Three small brownish-ochreous tufts are found towards the dorsum from one-third to before the tornus and there is a small brownish-ochreous spot in the middle of the disc and another at two-thirds. There is also a transverse black spot in the disc towards the apex, preceded by two brownish-ochreous dots transversely placed. Three brownish-ochreous dots are found on the costa and two on the termen towards the apex, separated with black and with a more distinct small black spot at the apex. The hindwings are light grey thinly scaled towards the base, with the margins and veins suffused with darker grey.

References

Moths described in 1920
Telphusa
Taxa named by Edward Meyrick